Northwestern High School is one of three high schools in Rock Hill, South Carolina, United States. It was opened in 1971 as the city's second high school, replacing Emmett Scott High School, which had been designated for African American students during the era of segregated schools. Along with rival Rock Hill High School, it is one of the 16 largest schools in the state by enrollment, with about 1,791 students in grades 9–12.

Northwestern offers the International Baccalaureate diploma.

Presidential candidate Barack Obama spoke at Northwestern on October 6, 2007.

Athletics 

The Northwestern Trojans are in Region III-AAAAA in the state of South Carolina. There are seventeen sports with thirty teams representing the school. The Trojans have a rich tradition both on and off the field. The football team is consistently ranked in the top ten in South Carolina and has played in six of the last eight state championships winning the championship in 2010, 2013, and 2015. The soccer team has been in the state championship game five out of the last six years, winning the championship in the 2006 and 2008 seasons. In 2009, they had an undefeated season.

In the 4A State Championship game, the Trojans defeated Irmo 3-1, claiming the State Championship as well as the ESPN Rise High School National Championship. The following season, the teams met up again in the 4A State Championship game.  Northwestern once again proved too much for the Yellow Jackets, winning 4-2. This secured their third consecutive championship and their fourth title in five years.

The boys' cross country team won the state championship in 2005 and 2006.

In the 2009 football season, the Trojans defeated rivals South Pointe High School in the 4A state-semifinals on November 27, 2009, at the Rock Hill School District Football Stadium. This propelled them to the state championship game at Williams-Brice Stadium in Columbia where they lost to Berkeley.

On July 10, 2010 it was announced that Northwestern would play South Pointe High School, in a nationally televised double-header on ESPN August 28. Northwestern showed their power offense in that game where they beat South Pointe 42–20. The key came when they scored five touchdowns in 4 minutes and 50 seconds in the third quarter, taking a 20–7 deficit to 42–20. In the 2010 football season, the Trojans had a perfect 15–0 season and went to the state championship game at South Carolina's Williams-Brice Stadium, playing Greenwood. The Trojans defeated Greenwood 42–10 and won the state championship. In 2012 second year head coach Kyle Richardson led the Trojans back to the state championship, where they lost to Greenwood in overtime.

In 2010 QB Justin Worley was named National Gatorade Player of the Year, joining previous winners Kobe Bryant, Lebron James, and numerous other pro athletes. Worley is the first and only National Gatorade Player of Year from South Carolina.

The baseball team is consistently in the playoffs, and has produced numerous collegiate players.

Northwestern athletics have produced several collegiate student-athletes, going to such major universities as Virginia Tech, Clemson University, South Carolina, Florida State, Georgia, Notre Dame, Ohio State and The College of Charleston.

State Championships 
 Football: 1989, 1993, 2010, 2013, 2015
Basketball: 
 Boys' Soccer: 2006, 2008, 2009, 2010
 The Purple Regiment Marching Band: 2008
 Boys' Cross Country: 2005, 2006
 Baseball: 2017

National Championships 
 Boys' Soccer: ESPN Rise 2009 National Champions

Notable alumni 

 Sean Barnette, professional basketball player
 Jeff Burris, former NFL player and current college football coach
 Shawn Ferguson, professional soccer player
 Ricky Garbanzo, professional soccer player
 Brandon Hudgins, professional runner
 Johnathan Joseph, NFL cornerback, 2x Pro Bowl selection
 Cheslie Kryst, Miss USA 2019
 Alex Martinez, professional soccer player
 Enzo Martinez, professional soccer player
 Cordarrelle Patterson, NFL wide receiver, 4x Pro Bowl selection and Super Bowl LIII champion with the New England Patriots
 Jamie Robinson, CFL linebacker
 Derek Ross, NFL cornerback
 Mason Rudolph, NFL quarterback
 Rick Sanford, NFL defensive back
 Nate Torbett, professional soccer player
 Benjamin Watson, NFL tight end, Super Bowl XXXIX champion with the New England Patriots
 Justin Worley, NFL quarterback

References

External links 
 

Buildings and structures in Rock Hill, South Carolina
Public high schools in South Carolina
Schools in York County, South Carolina
International Baccalaureate schools in South Carolina